Brenda Vianey Magaña Almaral (born July 27, 1977 in Guadalajara, Jalisco) is a Mexican artistic gymnast. Magana is best known for being the first woman to successfully complete a triple back somersault dismount from the uneven bars, which she did at the 2002 World Artistic Gymnastics Championships in Debrecen, Hungary.

She began practicing gymnastics at the age of three at the Club Deportivo Atlas Paradero in Guadalajara but then started training at WOGA Gymnastics in Texas, United States. She was five years old when she participated in her first international competition in Czechoslovakia.

Eponymous skill
Magaña has one eponymous skill listed in the Code of Points.

References

External links
 
 Profile at deporte.org.mx 

1977 births
Living people
Mexican female artistic gymnasts
Sportspeople from Guadalajara, Jalisco
Competitors at the 1993 Central American and Caribbean Games
Competitors at the 1998 Central American and Caribbean Games
Competitors at the 2001 Summer Universiade
Competitors at the 2002 Central American and Caribbean Games
Gymnasts at the 1991 Pan American Games
Gymnasts at the 2003 Pan American Games
Gymnasts at the 2004 Summer Olympics
Olympic gymnasts of Mexico
Pan American Games silver medalists for Mexico
Pan American Games bronze medalists for Mexico
Originators of elements in artistic gymnastics
Pan American Games medalists in gymnastics
Medalists at the 2003 Pan American Games
Central American and Caribbean Games gold medalists for Mexico
Central American and Caribbean Games silver medalists for Mexico
Central American and Caribbean Games medalists in gymnastics
21st-century Mexican women
20th-century Mexican women